Miroslav Boyadzhiev (born 18 July 1979) is a Bulgarian short track speed skater. He competed in three events at the 2002 Winter Olympics.

References

External links
 

1979 births
Living people
Bulgarian male short track speed skaters
Olympic short track speed skaters of Bulgaria
Short track speed skaters at the 2002 Winter Olympics
Sportspeople from Sofia